Route 49 is a Connecticut state highway from Route 2 in Stonington to Route 14A in Sterling, in the southeast part of the state. It is a scenic route that runs  through the Pachaug State Forest.

Route description

Route 49 begins as North Street at an intersection with Route 2 in the northeastern corner of the town of Stonington. It proceeds north into the town of North Stonington as Pendleton Hill Road, intersecting with Interstate 95 and Route 184. Route 49 continues north, soon intersecting Route 216. As it enters the town of Voluntown, Route 49 then becomes Westerly Road, while still on a northward track. Route 49 briefly overlaps with Route 165 and Route 138 within the town center. North of the overlap, Route 49 continues as Ekonk Hill Road, crossing the Pachaug River and running through the Pachaug State Forest, before reaching its end at Route 14A in the Sterling Hill Historic District of the town of Sterling.

Route 49 is designated as a scenic road from Route 184 (milepost 2.09) in North Stonington to milepost 12.95 (south of Route 165) in Voluntown and from the Voluntown boat launch (milepost 13.84) to the northern terminus in Sterling.

History
In the 1920s, the road from the northeast corner of Stonington (at New England Route 17) heading north through North Stonington and Voluntown to the Sterling Hill section of Sterling was designated as State Highway 216. In the 1932 state highway renumbering, State Highway 216 was renumbered to Route 95. In 1950, Route 95 was extended east along modern Route 14A up to the Rhode Island state line.   In 1958, Interstate 95 was formally designated in Connecticut, and Route 95 was in need of a new designation due to the numbering conflict. The new designation chosen was Route 49. In 1963, as a result of the Route Reclassification Act, Route 14A was created and the north end of Route 49 was relocated to its current terminus.

In early 2003, work on Route 49 and Route 14A Corridor Management Plan was started, funded by the FHWA and ConnDOT. The concerns are speed along Route 49, stone walls, and the surrounding scenery.

Junction list

References

External links

049
Transportation in New London County, Connecticut
Transportation in Windham County, Connecticut